1956 in Korea may refer to:
1956 in North Korea
1956 in South Korea